Louis Warden Crooks, OBE (1912–1989) was Archdeacon of Raphoe  in the Province of Armagh in the Church of Irelandfrom 1957 until 1980.

Crooks father was also called an Anglican clergyman called Louis Warden Crooks. Crooks was educated at Campbell College and Trinity College, Dublin; and ordained in 1937. After a curacy at Templemore he was a chaplain to the Forces from 1939 to 1946. He was rector of Conwall from 1946 to 1980; and also chaplain to the Parliament of Northern Ireland.

References

Archdeacons of Raphoe
Alumni of Trinity College Dublin
People educated at Campbell College
1912 births
1989 deaths
Officers of the Order of the British Empire
Army chaplains
20th-century Irish Anglican priests